Peter was a governor of Rome, Roman consul, and brother of Pope John X. He became consul after the death of Alberic I of Spoleto.

Sources
 George L. Williams. Papal Genealogy: The Families And Descendants Of The Popes

10th-century Italian nobility
People of medieval Rome
Medieval Roman consuls
Year of birth unknown